Plecoptera quaesita is a species of moth of the family Noctuidae. It is found in India, Sri Lanka, Burma, Andamans, Borneo, Northern Moluccas and Australia.

External links
Moths of Borneo

Catocalinae